USS Fashion (ID-755), later USS Freight Lighter No. 116, later USS YF-116, was a United States Navy freight lighter in commission from 1918 to 1922.

Fashion was built as a commercial barge of the same name in 1915 by Richard Rodermond in New York. In 1918, the U.S. Navy acquired her from her owner, Eugene Coop of New York, for use during World War I. Assigned the naval registry identification number 755, he was placed in service in 1918 as USS Fashion (ID-755). She later was renamed USS Freight Lighter No. 116.

When the U.S. Navy adopted its modern hull number system on 17 July 1920, Freight Lighter No. 116 was classified as a YF (freight lighter) under the new system and renamed USS YF-116.

YF-116 was taken out of service on 8 May 1922. She was sold in 1922.

References
ID-755 Fashion at Department of the Navy Naval History and Heritage Command Online Library of Selected Images: U.S. Navy Ships -- Listed by Hull Number: "SP" #s and "ID" #s -- World War I Era Patrol Vessels and other Acquired Ships and Craft numbered from SP-700 through SP-799
NavSource Online: Section Patrol Craft Photo Archive YF-116 ex-Freight Lighter No. 116 ex-Fashion (ID 755)

Auxiliary ships of the United States Navy
World War I auxiliary ships of the United States
Ships built in New York City
1915 ships